Fairview Heights station may refer to:

Fairview Heights station (Los Angeles Metro)
Fairview Heights station (MetroLink)